Great Wood and Dodd's Grove is a  biological Site of Special Scientific Interest in Leigh-on-Sea in Essex. It is also a Local Nature Reserve called Belfairs. Essex Wildlife Trust runs the Belfairs Woodland Centre and manages the site together with Southend-on-Sea City Council.

This is a small remnant of the ancient Hadleigh Great Wood. It is coppiced oak woodland on sands, gravels and clay, and one of the largest areas of old woodland in the south of the county. Bramble and honeysuckle are the main ground plants. Other plants include the rare broad-leaved helleborine. The site has toilets, a café and trails.

There is access from Poors Lane, which runs through the site.

References 

Sites of Special Scientific Interest in Essex
Local Nature Reserves in Essex
Essex Wildlife Trust